The 2019 Virgin Australia All-Australian team represents the best performed Australian Football League (AFL) players during the 2019 season. It was announced on 28 August as a complete Australian rules football team of 22 players. The team is honorary and does not play any games.

Selection panel
The selection panel for the 2019 All-Australian team consisted of chairman Gillon McLachlan, Kevin Bartlett, Luke Darcy, Danny Frawley, Steve Hocking, Glen Jakovich, Chris Johnson, Cameron Ling, Matthew Richardson and Warren Tredrea.

Team

Initial squad
The initial 40-man All-Australian squad was announced on 26 August.  had the most players selected in the initial squad with seven, while minor premiers  had six.

Final team
Geelong and West Coast each had the most selections with four.  captain Nat Fyfe was announced as the All-Australian captain, with West Coast captain Shannon Hurn announced as vice-captain. The team saw nine players selected in an All-Australian team for the first time in their careers and only ten clubs were represented.

Note: the position of coach in the All-Australian team is traditionally awarded to the coach of the premiership team.

References

All-Australian team